The Cuitlatec (alternatively Cuitlateco, Cuitlateca) were an indigenous people of Mexico. They lived in the Río Balsas region of Guerrero state in Mexico's Pacific coast region. Their native Cuitlatec language is generally considered to be a language isolate. As a linguistic group and ethnic identity Cuitlatec is considered extinct.

References

External links
  Teniente José Azueta
  Cuadro descriptivo y comparativo de las lenguas indígenas de México Biblioteca Virtual Miguel de Cervantes

Indigenous peoples in Mexico
Guerrero
Extinct ethnic groups